Luís Marcelo Durán (born August 31, 1974 in Montevideo, Uruguay) is a former Uruguayan footballer who played for clubs of Uruguay, Chile and Peru.

Teams
  Liverpool 1996
  El Tanque Sisley 1997–1998
  Racing 1999
  Huachipato 2000
  Central Español 2001–2003
  Melgar 2003
  Cerro 2004
  Fénix 2005
  San Marcos de Arica 2005
  Cerro Largo 2006–2007
  Arturo Fernández Vial 2007
  Cerro Largo 2008
  Juventud Las Piedras 2009–2010

References
 
 Profile at Tenfield Digital 

1974 births
Living people
Uruguayan footballers
Uruguayan expatriate footballers
Liverpool F.C. (Montevideo) players
Racing Club de Montevideo players
Centro Atlético Fénix players
Juventud de Las Piedras players
C.A. Cerro players
Central Español players
El Tanque Sisley players
C.D. Arturo Fernández Vial footballers
San Marcos de Arica footballers
C.D. Huachipato footballers
FBC Melgar footballers
Primera B de Chile players
Chilean Primera División players
Expatriate footballers in Chile
Expatriate footballers in Peru
Association football forwards